Suchith Suresan (born 24 August 1987) is an Indian playback singer in the Tamil, Telugu, Malayalam and Kannada film industries.

Personal life

Suchith Suresan was born to C. Suresan, a retired government servant and a reputed painter who focuses in oil-on-canvas; and K.P. Sucheeta, a retired banker, on 25 August 1987 at Trivandrum. He joined Madras Christian College Chennai for a degree in visual communications. He is married to Nimi Chandrika who is working in a Research firm at Bangalore. He has an elder brother, Dr. Surej, who plays drums for an alternate-rock band based in Trivandrum called SPASM and is also an assistant surgeon in the health service department of the Govt. of Kerala.

Career

Suresan made his debut with the song "Pulayodu" from Saadhu Mirandaal, and reached fame with the song "Karigalan" from Vettaikaaran, composed by Vijay Antony.

Since then, he has lent his voice to many films, including Chikku Bukku and Nanban.

His contributions to the soundtrack of Dam 999 earned him a nomination on the preliminary list for the 84th Academy Awards (Oscars).

Suresan sang the jingle for the Radio Mango 91.9 FM, composed by Deepak Dev, which scored the World Bronze Award (2009) for best station jingle at the New York Festivals.

Suresan studied Carnatic and Hindustani music under gurus Sri. Aryanadu Raju and composer Sri. Ramesh Narayan.

He is the lead vocalist of the indie rock band Udaan.

Discography

References 

1987 births
Living people
Malayalam playback singers
Musicians from Thiruvananthapuram
Indian male playback singers